is a Japanese sprinter. He competed in 200 metres at the 2012 Summer Olympics in London, and was part of the Japanese 4 × 400 m team. He also competed in the 2013 World Championships in Athletics, held in Moscow. More recently he took part in 100 metres races in various meetings, clocking 10.09 into a slight headwind in Kawasaki in May 2015, performing well enough to represent Japan in the 100 m at the 2015 World Championships as well as in the 200 m.  He competed at the 2016 Olympics in the 200 m, only.

International competitions

Personal bests
Outdoor
100 metres – 10.09 (-0.1 m/s, Kawasaki 2015)
200 metres – 20.14 (+1.0 m/s, Kumagaya 2015)

References

External links
 
 
 
 

1988 births
Living people
People from Shizuoka (city)
Sportspeople from Shizuoka Prefecture
Japanese male sprinters
Olympic male sprinters
Olympic athletes of Japan
Athletes (track and field) at the 2012 Summer Olympics
Athletes (track and field) at the 2016 Summer Olympics
Asian Games medalists in athletics (track and field)
Asian Games silver medalists for Japan
Asian Games bronze medalists for Japan
Athletes (track and field) at the 2014 Asian Games
Medalists at the 2014 Asian Games
World Athletics Championships athletes for Japan
Japan Championships in Athletics winners
21st-century Japanese people